UFC 162: Silva vs. Weidman was a mixed martial arts event on July 6, 2013, at the MGM Grand Garden Arena in Las Vegas, Nevada.

Background
The main event was a UFC Middleweight Championship bout between long time title holder Anderson Silva and undefeated top contender Chris Weidman.

Also, co-featured on the card was expected to be a bout between top featherweight contenders Ricardo Lamas and Chan Sung Jung; however on June 14, it was announced that Jung had been pulled from the Lamas bout and would replace an injured Anthony Pettis to face José Aldo on August 3, 2013 at UFC 163.  As a result, Lamas was pulled from the event.

A bout between Thiago Silva and Rafael Cavalcante, briefly linked to this event, was moved to UFC on Fuel TV: Nogueira vs. Werdum.

John Makdessi was expected to face Edson Barboza at the event; however, Makdessi, pulled out of the bout citing an injury and was replaced by Rafaello Oliveira.

Shane del Rosario was originally scheduled to face Dave Herman at the event; however, del Rosario was forced off the card due to injury and replaced by Gabriel Gonzaga.

Results

Bonus awards
The following fighters were awarded $50,000 bonuses.

 Fight of The Night: Frankie Edgar vs. Charles Oliveira and Cub Swanson vs. Dennis Siver
 Knockout of The Night: Chris Weidman
 Submission of the Night: None awarded as no matches ended by submission

Reported payout
The following is the reported payout to the fighters as reported to the Nevada State Athletic Commission. It does not include sponsor money and also does not include the UFC's traditional "fight night" bonuses.
 Chris Weidman: $48,000 (includes $24,000 win bonus) def. Anderson Silva: $600,000
 Frankie Edgar: $240,000 (includes $120,000 win bonus) def. Charles Oliveira: $21,000
 Tim Kennedy: $90,000 (includes $30,000 win bonus) def. Roger Gracie: $50,000
 Mark Muñoz: $84,000 (includes $42,000 win bonus) def. Tim Boetsch: $37,000
 Cub Swanson: $58,000 (includes $29,000 win bonus) def. Dennis Siver: $33,000
 Andrew Craig: $24,000 (includes $12,000 win bonus) def. Chris Leben: $51,000
 Norman Parke: $30,000 (includes $15,000 win bonus) def. Kazuki Tokudome: $8,000
 Gabriel Gonzaga: $58,000 (includes $29,000 win bonus) def. Dave Herman: $23,000
 Edson Barboza: $46,000 (includes $23,000 win bonus) def. Rafaello Oliveira: $14,000
 Brian Melancon: $16,000 (includes $8,000 win bonus) def. Seth Baczynski: $16,000
 Mike Pierce: $56,000 (includes $28,000 win bonus) def. David Mitchell: $10,000

See also
List of UFC events
2013 in UFC

References

External links
Official UFC past events page
UFC events results at Sherdog.com

Ultimate Fighting Championship events
2013 in mixed martial arts
Mixed martial arts in Las Vegas
2013 in sports in Nevada
MGM Grand Garden Arena